Zindagi is a word of Persian origin, which means "life". It may refer to:

Film 
 Zindagi (1940 film), a Bollywood film directed by P. C. Barua
 Zindagi (1964 film), a Bollywood film directed by Ramanand Sagar
 Zindagi (1976 film), a Bollywood film directed by Ravi Tandon
 Zindagi Zindagi, a 1972 Bollywood film directed by Tapan Sinha

Literature 
Zindagi (novel), an Urdu novel by Chaudhry Afzal Haq

Music 
 Zindagi, a 1995 soundtrack album by Shehzad Roy
 Zindagi (album), a 2007 album by Zubeen Garg

Television 
 ARY Zindagi, a Pakistani entertainment television channel
 Zindagi (TV channel), an Indian entertainment television channel

See also